Lento is a genus of skippers in the family Hesperiidae.

Species
Recognised species in the genus Lento include:
 Lento lento (Ménétriés, 1829)

Former species
Lento vicinus (Plötz, 1884) - transferred to Corticea vicinus (Plötz, 1884)
Lento hermione (Schaus, 1913) - transferred to Hermio hermione (Schaus, 1913)

References

Sources
Natural History Museum Lepidoptera genus database

Hesperiinae
Hesperiidae genera